The Nueces River is a river in the U.S. state of Texas, about  long. It drains a region in central and southern Texas southeastward into the Gulf of Mexico. It is the southernmost major river in Texas northeast of the Rio Grande.  Nueces is Spanish for nuts; early settlers named the river after the numerous pecan trees along its banks.

Location and flow
The Nueces rises northwest of San Antonio in the Edwards Plateau, in Real County, roughly 50 mi (80 km) north of Uvalde. It flows south through the Texas Hill Country, past Barksdale and Crystal City, approaching to within 35 mi (56 km) of the Rio Grande on the border with Mexico. In central Live Oak County, it is joined from the northwest at Three Rivers by the Atascosa River and Frio River, then flows southeast along the coastal plain past Mathis where it is impounded to form the Lake Corpus Christi reservoir. It enters Corpus Christi Bay on the Gulf of Mexico at Corpus Christi.

History
Called Chotilapacquen by Coahuiltecan-speaking groups, the river was named "Nueces" by Alonso de León referring to the abundant pecan tree groves. One of the first settlers to scout the area was Cpt. Blas María de la Garza Falcón in 1766. From before the end of the Texas Revolution, Mexico recognized that the Nueces River was historically the border between its states of Coahuila y Tejas and Tamaulipas.  However, the Republic of Texas claimed the Rio Grande as its border with Mexico, citing the Treaty of Velasco signed by Mexican President Santa Anna, who had agreed to the Rio Grande border within Texas after having lost the Battle of San Jacinto.  This contention continued after the annexation of Texas by the United States, and was one of the causes of the Mexican–American War. The Treaty of Guadalupe Hidalgo ended the dispute, with Mexico—while under American occupation—recognizing the Rio Grande as its northern border.

Since the early 1800s, there have been rumors of lost Spanish mines in the vicinity of the Nueces River. These claims are based on the presence of two missions established in the region during the mid-1700s: San Lorenzo de la Santa Cruz and Nuestra Senora de la Candelaria, the latter of which was located near the present-day ghost town of Montell.

On August 10, 1862, pro-Union Germans from the Texas Hill Country trying to flee to Mexico were ambushed and killed by Confederates—the Nueces massacre.

Fishing
The Nueces is one of several clear, warm-water spring creeks in the Hill Country of Texas.  In its upper reaches, the water is clear and cool.

Unlike spring trout creeks in the Rocky Mountains, the Nueces holds largemouth bass, smallmouth bass, and the native Guadalupe bass, along with a variety of panfish such as redbreast sunfish, rock bass, green sunfish, and Rio Grande perch. The American alligator also inhabits the Nueces River.

See also
List of Texas rivers
Fly Fishing
Nueces Bay
Nueces County, Texas

References

External links

 Nueces River Authority home page

 
Rivers of Texas
Bodies of water of Dimmit County, Texas
Bodies of water of Edwards County, Texas
Bodies of water of Jim Wells County, Texas
Bodies of water of La Salle County, Texas
Bodies of water of Live Oak County, Texas
Bodies of water of McMullen County, Texas
Bodies of water of Real County, Texas
Bodies of water of San Patricio County, Texas
Rivers of Uvalde County, Texas
Rivers of Zavala County, Texas